Jozef Stümpel (born 20 July 1972) is a Slovak former professional ice hockey centre. He played in the National Hockey League with the Boston Bruins, Los Angeles Kings, and Florida Panthers between 1992 and 2008. Internationally Stümpel played for the Slovak national team at several tournaments, including the 2002, 2006, and 2010 Winter Olympics, and eight World Championships, winning a gold in 2002.

Playing career
Stümpel was selected in the second round, 40th overall, by the Boston Bruins in the 1991 NHL Entry draft, and immediately joined the Bruins organization. Prior to the 2004–05 NHL lockout season, Stümpel had played for only two clubs, the Bruins and the Los Angeles Kings. For the 2005–06 season, Stümpel joined the Florida Panthers.

Stümpel was placed on unconditional waivers on June 27, 2008, and Florida decided to buy out his contract.

On May 4, 2011, Stümpel moved from the Kontinental Hockey League (KHL)'s Dinamo Minsk to Spartak Moscow.

A long-time friend of Žigmund Pálffy since the beginning of their professional careers, they were often line-mates on the Slovak national team.

Awards
Boston Bruins' E.C. Dufresne Trophy as the best player on home ice in 1996–97

Career statistics

Regular season and playoffs

International 

Source

Awards and honours

See also
 Slovaks in the NHL

References

External links
 
 
 
 

1972 births
Living people
Barys Nur-Sultan players
Boston Bruins draft picks
Boston Bruins players
Florida Panthers players
HC Dinamo Minsk players
HC Slovan Bratislava players
HC Spartak Moscow players
HK Dukla Trenčín players
HK Nitra players
Ice hockey players at the 2002 Winter Olympics
Ice hockey players at the 2006 Winter Olympics
Ice hockey players at the 2010 Winter Olympics
Kölner Haie players
Los Angeles Kings players
MHk 32 Liptovský Mikuláš players
Olympic ice hockey players of Slovakia
Oulun Kärpät players
Providence Bruins players
Sportspeople from Nitra
Slovak ice hockey centres
Czechoslovak expatriate sportspeople in Germany
Czechoslovak expatriate ice hockey people
Czechoslovak ice hockey centres
Slovak expatriate ice hockey players in Germany
Slovak expatriate ice hockey players in the United States
Slovak expatriate ice hockey players in Russia
Slovak expatriate ice hockey players in the Czech Republic
Slovak expatriate sportspeople in Kazakhstan
Slovak expatriate sportspeople in Belarus
Slovak expatriate ice hockey players in Finland
Expatriate ice hockey players in Belarus
Expatriate ice hockey players in Kazakhstan